The 2008–09 Midland Football Combination season was the 72nd in the history of Midland Football Combination, a football competition in England.

Premier Division

The Premier Division featured 18 clubs which competed in the division last season, along with three new clubs, promoted from Division One:
Coton Green
Knowle
Oldbury Athletic

Also, Barnt Green Spartak changed name to GSA.

League table

References

2008–09
10